The French group for the study of polymers and their application, also called more simply French polymer group (GFP) is a French nonprofit organization and learned society, which aims to promote polymer chemistry, physics, and material science in French industry and institutes of higher learning.

History

Creation of the GFP 
The GFP was created in 1970 by the polymer physicist André Kovacs and the chemist Georges Champetier, one of the first researchers in France to study polymer science. 
The statutes of the GFP set out the following goals:

 the advancement and dissemination of studies on macromolecular substances,
 the grouping of researchers studying polymers in order to promote exchanges of ideas and facilitate knowledge of scientific and technical progress in this field,
 the development of relationships between basic research and its applications.

The GFP is based in Strasbourg, where in 1954 the physicist Charles Sadron founded the first CNRS laboratory dedicated to polymer science, which became the Institut Charles Sadron in 1985. Its first general meeting was held on November 26–27, 1970 in Paris. Its first committee comprised Georges Champetier (President), Charles Sadron and René Riou (Vice-presidents), André Kovacs (Secretary general) and Constant Wippler (Treasurer). Since its founding, the presidency of the GFP has alternated between researchers based in academia and industry, while the secretary has always been a member of the Institut Charles Sadron (originally the CRM).

Sister societies and federations 
In May 1990, the GFP reached an agreement with the Société chimique de France, becoming its Division of "Polymeric materials and elastomers". In 2001 this agreement was modified to create a "Polymer and Materials Chemistry" Division that was common to the two societies. In 2002, a similar agreement with the Société française de physique created a common "Polymer" Division between the two organizations. The GFP is a founding member of the Fédération française des matériaux (French Materials Federation),  and a member of the European Polymer Federation, whose first conference was organized by the GFP in Lyon in 1986. In 2020, the GFP signed a Memorandum of Understanding with the  Society of Polymer Science Japan.

Activities

Conferences and Workshops 
The GFP organizes numerous national and regional conferences and workshops. Its flagship event is the Colloque national du GFP,  held each November in a different French city, with a typical attendance of 180-250 participants. In addition, the JEPO  is an annual conference aimed at students and early career researchers, while the RNJP targets newly established researchers in permanent positions. Finally the GFP organizes regular workshops and training sessions on more specialized subjects.

Regional sections 

The GFP comprises 7 regional sections, covering different geographical areas of France (Grand Ouest, Nord, Ile de France, Est, Rhône-Alpes-Auvergne, Méditerranée, Sud Ouest). Each section elects a president who participates in the Administrative Council of the GFP. Organisation of national events (the Colloque national and JEPO) rotates between the sections, while each section organises local events.

Publications 

The GFP publishes a newsletter "Actualités du GFP", 2-3 times per year. Additionally, its Education Commission periodically releases books on different aspects of polymers and their applications. In 2004, the GFP joined forces with the International Union for Pure and Applied Chemistry to promote education in polymer science in French-speaking countries.

Awards and distinctions 

The GFP bestows several annual or biennial awards, alone or jointly with the SCF or the SFP:

 Polymer Thesis Award of the Education Commission of the GFP (annual)
 Polymer Division Award, jointly awarded with the SCF, recognizing an early career scientist (less than 40 years old) for significant scientific results or original techniques in polymer chemistry (biennial, since 1992)
 Polymer Division Award, jointly awarded with the SFP, recognizing an early career scientist (less than 40 years old) for significant scientific results or original techniques in polymer physics (biennial, since 2004)
 Grand Prix of the GFP, recognizing the career or the complete works of a French or international researcher in polymer science (biennial, since 2003)
 Prix d'Honneur of the GFP, recognizing a scientific career dedicated to polymer science (annual, since 2017)

Presidents and secretaries general

Notes and references

External links 
 

Learned societies of France
Scientific organizations based in France
Chemistry societies
Chemistry education